Djilali Selmi (born 4 September 1946) is an Algerian former footballer who played as a midfielder. Selmi played in 10 matches for the Algeria national team between 1967 and 1973, representing Algeria at the 1968 African Cup of Nations.

References

External links
 

1946 births
Living people
Algerian footballers
Algeria international footballers
1968 African Cup of Nations players
Place of birth missing (living people)
Association football midfielders
21st-century Algerian people